The Roman Catholic Metropolitan Archdiocese of Bangalore is an ecclesiastical territory or diocese of the Catholic Church in India. It was erected as pro-vicariate from (16 March 1845 to 2 April 1850), as Vicariate from (3 April 1850 - 31 August 1886), as Diocese of Mysore - Bangalore in the Ecclesiastical Metropolitan Province of Pondicherry in Southern India from (1 September 1886 - 12 February 1940), as Diocese of Bangalore on 13 February 1940 by Pope Pius XII, and elevated to the rank of a Metropolitan Archdiocese on 19 September 1953, with the Suffragan Dioceses of Belgaum, Bellary, Chikmagalur, Gulbarga, Karwar, Mangalore, Udupi, Mysore, and Shimoga.

The archdiocese's mother church and thus seat of its archbishop is the St. Francis Xavier's Cathedral, Bangalore; Bangalore also houses St. Mary's Basilica. Bishop Peter Machado was appointed Archbishop of Bangalore by Pope Francis on 19 March 2018.

List of Vicar Apostolic, Bishop and Archbishops of Bangalore
Bishop Etienne-Louis Charbonnaux, M.E.P. (1845–1873)
Bishop Joseph-Auguste Chevalier, M.E.P. (1873–1880)
Bishop Jean-Yves-Marie Coadou, M.E.P. (1880–1890)
Bishop Eugène-Louis Kleiner, M.E.P. (1890–1910)
Bishop Augustin-François Baslé, M.E.P. (1910–1915)
Bishop Hippolyte Teissier, M.E.P. (1916–1922)
Bishop Maurice-Bernard-Benoit-Joseph Despatures, M.E.P. (1922–1942)
Archbishop Thomas Pothacamury (1942–1967)
His Eminence Duraisamy Simon Lourdusamy (Auxiliary Bishop (1962-1964), Coadjutor Archbishop (1964-1967), Archbishop of Bangalore (1967–1971))
Archbishop Packiam Arokiaswamy (1971–1986)
Archbishop Alphonsus Mathias (1986–1998)
Archbishop Ignatius Paul Pinto (1998–2004)
Monsignor Thomas Jabamalai (Apostolic Administrator, Archdiocese of Bangalore (2004))
Archbishop Bernard Blasius Moras (2004–2018)
Archbishop Peter Machado (2018 – Present)

Saints and causes for canonisation
 Ven. Veronica of the Passion (Sophia Leeves)  
 Servant of God Teresa of St. Rose of Lima

See also
 Catholic Church in India
 Infant Jesus Church, Bangalore

References

External links
Official site
Catholic-Hierarchy
GCatholic.org

Christian organizations established in 1940
Roman Catholic dioceses in India
Roman Catholic dioceses and prelatures established in the 20th century
Christianity in Karnataka
Organisations based in Bangalore
1940 establishments in India